is a railway station in the city of Shimada, Shizuoka Prefecture, Japan, operated by the Ōigawa Railway.

Lines
Higiri Station is on the Ōigawa Main Line and is 4.3 from the terminus of the line at Kanaya Station.

Station layout
The station has a single side platform. There is no station building and the station is unattended.

Adjacent stations

|-
!colspan=5|Ōigawa Railway

Station history
Higiri Station was opened on July 23, 1985.

Passenger statistics
In fiscal 2017, the station was used by an average of 8 passengers daily (boarding passengers only).

Surrounding area
Japan National Route 473

See also
 List of Railway Stations in Japan

References

External links

 Ōigawa Railway home page

Stations of Ōigawa Railway
Railway stations in Shizuoka Prefecture
Railway stations in Japan opened in 1985
Shimada, Shizuoka